The Campeonato Brasileiro de Marcas e Pilotos (Brazilian Championship of Brand and Drivers) was a touring car racing based in Brazil. It had two incarnations, the first one between 1983 and 1994, and the second one between 2004 and 2009.

Start in 1983 the Campeonato Brasileiro de Marcas e Pilotos was a strong touring car racing championship, with direct involvement of the manufactures, had its last year of competition in 1994, the champions were Egon Herzfield and Vicente Daudt, who run with the Ford Escort. At the end of 1994 season, the promise was that we would have for the 1995 season imported cars, utilize in some championships as; BTCC or DTM, but this promise was not fulfilled and the championship was declared ended. 

After ten years, in 2004 that announced the return of the championship with new rules and cars, organized for Toninho de Souza and Brazilian Confederation of Auto Racing (CBA), the championship not obtained success and was ended in 2009.

In 2011 that announced the return of the championship with Brasileiro de Marcas name and completely reworked.

Champions

1983–1994

2004–2009

Auto racing series in Brazil
Touring car racing series
Recurring sporting events established in 1983
Recurring sporting events disestablished in 2009
Defunct auto racing series
Motorsport competitions in Brazil